Events in the year 2023 in Uganda.

Incumbents 

 President: Yoweri Museveni
 Vice President: Jessica Alupo
 Prime Minister: Robinah Nabbanja

Events 
Ongoing — COVID-19 pandemic in Uganda

 1 January – At least nine people are killed and many others are injured during a stampede at a music show in Kampala.
 6 January – At least 16 people are killed and 21 others are injured in a bus crash en route to the city of Gulu from Kampala, in northern Uganda.
 8 January – Twenty-one people are killed and 49 others injured when a bus heading for Nairobi, Kenya, crashes after crossing the border from Uganda.
 11 January – Ugandan Health Minister Jane Aceng declares an end to the outbreak of Sudan ebolavirus in the country that has killed 77 people since September.
 9 March – The parliament of Uganda begins debate on a proposed bill that would criminalize people identifying as part of the LGBTQ community with up to 10 years in prison. The bill would also criminalize the "promotion" of homosexuality and "abetting" or "conspiring" to engage in same-sex relations.

Deaths 

 10 January – Sezi Mbaguta, 76, politician, MP (2011–2016).

See also 

International Conference on the Great Lakes Region
COVID-19 pandemic in Africa

References 

 
2020s in Uganda
Years of the 21st century in Uganda
Uganda
Uganda